Trinity Medical Sciences University (TMSU) is an offshore private medical school with its Basic Science part of the MD program, Pre-medical program and Masters program located in Saint Vincent and the Grenadines in the Caribbean and Clinical Science part of the MD program in Warner Robins, GA in the United States. It opened in 2008, as a fully accredited medical facility to respond to a shortage of physicians in the United States and Canada. It has its administrative headquarters in Roswell, Georgia and it partners with Milton Cato Memorial Hospital located in Kingstown and Northwest Hospital in Baltimore.

Programs

School of Biomedical Sciences
For students who have not attained the four-semester prerequisite courses for entrance to medical school, the school offers undergraduate programs. The Pre-Medical program provides students with the 90 credit hours of basic medical curriculum for those who have not attained applicable credits from foreign universities. Because criteria vary from nation to nation, students who have earned college level credit previously, are recommended to submit those credits for review to confirm their applicability to Trinity's academic requirements.

School of Medicine
The medical school curriculum is based on the US four-year model, requiring 130 weeks of study. Trinity's program consists of five terms of basic science study followed by five terms of clinical core and elective clerkships. Students successfully completing the ten terms which includes various NBME subject exams and passing the USMLE Steps 1, 2CK, and 2CS are awarded a Doctor of Medicine degree.

Because of Trinity's unique relationship with Milton Cato Memorial Hospital, for which Trinity pays an annual fee for the right to collaborate and co-funds a pediatric surgeon for public-sector practice, students are able to begin participation in patient care in the first semester of medical school. In addition to providing care at Milton Cato Hospital, students support the health officers at the district clinics in Calliaqua, the Stubbs Polyclinic in Kingstown and at various health fairs on the island.

Clinical clerkships, taking place in years three and four (terms six through ten), are conducted with Trinity faculty and local staff at our network of affiliated  hospitals and medical facilities in Baltimore.

Health Science Program 
Trinity's masters of health sciences degree program is designed for students interested in pursuing medically related professions as well as hospital and business administrative professions. As the growing complexity of healthcare requires an advanced understanding of medicine and healthcare even in its allied professions, Trinity is also adapting to train professionals interested in those areas to provide a similar level of quality care through their own specialized roles that its physician graduates offer.

Service Culture 
Trinity Medical Sciences University is actively engaged in local community service, ranging from healthcare outreach under the umbrella of the school through student activities groups (such as Trinity's AMSA and CaMSA chapters) reaching out to local children's homes or charity groups on their own accord. A longstanding relationship with the World Pediatric Project gives high performing 5th term students an opportunity to assist visiting physicians in the field, creating greater exposure to complex medical cases while giving them an opportunity to ask questions and network with prominent North American physicians.

Accreditation
The Trinity Medical Sciences University was chartered and licensed in Saint Vincent and the Grenadines on 11 April 2008 and listed in the FAIMER International Medical Education Directory (IMED), now the World Directory of Medical Schools (WDMS), effective 19 September 2008. By virtue of its listing in the WDMS, students graduating from Trinity are authorized to take part in the United States Medical Licensing Examination three-part examinations. Those who pass the examinations are eligible according to the Educational Commission for Foreign Medical Graduates to register for and participate in the National Resident Matching Program (NRMP). In July 2015, Trinity Medical Sciences University received CAAM-HP accreditation. In September 2016, CAAM-HP of St. Vincent and the Grenadines was then recognized by the United States Department of Education's NCFMEA.

See also

 List of medical schools in the Caribbean
 Medical School
 International medical graduate

References

External links 
 Official Website
 School Blog

Bibliography

Education in Saint Vincent and the Grenadines
Kingstown
Medical schools in the Caribbean